Below are the results of season two of the World Poker Tour television series (2003–2004).

Results

Grand Prix de Paris
 Casino: Aviation Club de France, Paris
 Buy-in: €10,000
 4-Day Event: July 10, 2003 to July 13, 2003
 Number of Entries: 96
 Total Prize Pool: €894,400 (US$1,028,826)
 Number of Payouts: 9

Legends of Poker
 Casino: Bicycle Casino, Los Angeles
 Buy-in: $5,000
 3-Day Event: September 1, 2003 to September 3, 2003
 Number of Entries: 309
 Total Prize Pool: $1,545,000
 Number of Payouts: 27
 Winning Hand: 9-7 Borgata Poker Open
 Casino: Borgata, Atlantic City
 Buy-in: $5,000
 3-Day Event: September 20, 2003 to September 22, 2003
 Number of Entries: 235
 Total Prize Pool: $1,175,000
 Number of Payouts: 18

 Ultimate Poker Classic
 Casino: Radisson Aruba Resort & Casino, Palm Beach, Aruba
 Buy-in: $4,000
 1-Day Event: October 18, 2003
 Number of Entries: 436
 Total Prize Pool: $1,697,460
 Number of Payouts: 20

 World Poker Finals
 Casino: Foxwoods Resort Casino, Mashantucket, Connecticut
 Buy-in: $10,000
 3-Day Event: November 14, 2003 to November 17, 2003
 Number of Entries: 313
 Total Prize Pool: $3,155,000
 Number of Payouts: 27

 Five Diamond World Poker Classic
 Casino: Bellagio, Paradise, Nevada
 Buy-in: $10,000
 4-Day Event: December 15, 2003 to December 18, 2003
 Number of Entries: 314
 Total Prize Pool: $3,044,750
 Number of Payouts: 36

 PokerStars Caribbean Poker Adventure
 Buy-in: $7,500 
 1-Day Event: January 25, 2004
 Number of Entries: 221
 Total Prize Pool: $1,657,501
 Number of Payouts: 27

 World Poker Open
 Casino: Horseshoe Casino & Hotel, Tunica
 Buy-in: $10,000
 4-Day Event: January 26, 2004 to January 29, 2004
 Number of Entries: 367
 Total Prize Pool: $3,455,050
 Number of Payouts: 27

 L.A. Poker Classic
 Casino: Commerce Casino, Los Angeles 
 Buy-in: $10,000
 4-Day Event: February 21, 2004 to February 24, 2004
 Number of Entries: 382
 Total Prize Pool: $3,781,500
 Number of Payouts: 27
 Winning Hand: A-A

Bay 101 Shooting Star
 Casino: Bay 101, San José
 Buy-in: $5,000
 3-Day Event: March 3, 2004 to March 5, 2004
 Number of Entries: 243
 Total Prize Pool: $1,125,000
 Number of Payouts: 27

Party Poker Million
 Casino:
 Buy-in:
 2-Day Event: March 18, 2004
 Number of Entries: 546
 Total Prize Pool:
 Number of Payouts:
 Winning Hand:

World Poker Challenge
 Casino: Reno Hilton, Reno
 Buy-in: $5,000
 3-Day Event: March 30, 2004 to April 1, 2004
 Number of Entries: 342
 Total Prize Pool: $1,658,700
 Number of Payouts: 27

WPT Championship
 Casino: Bellagio, Las Vegas 
 Buy-in: $25,000
 5-Day Event: April 19, 2004 to April 23, 2004
 Number of Entries: 343
 Total Prize Pool: $8,342,000
 Number of Payouts: 50

Other Events
During season 2 of the WPT there was one special event that did not apply to the Player of the Year standings:
 The WPT Invitational - February 25–26, 2004 - Commerce Casino - postscript to Event #9: L.A. Poker Classic

References 

World Poker Tour
2003 in poker
2004 in poker